Arlette Thomas (1927–2015) was a French stage, film and television actress. She also worked frequently as a voice actress, dubbing foreign films for their French release.

She was awarded the Prix Suzanne Bianchetti in 1949. She is the mother of the actor Pierre Jolivet.

Selected filmography
 Land Without Stars (1946)
 White Paws (1949)
 Le paradis des pilotes perdus (1949)
 The Strange Madame X (1951)
 Huis clos (1954)
 The Grand Maneuver (1955)
 Girl and the River (1958)
 Naked Hearts (1966)
 A Time for Dying (1969)
 Les Misérables (1982)

References

Bibliography
 Bessy, Maurice & Chirat, Raymond. Histoire du cinéma français: encyclopédie des films, 1940–1950. Pygmalion, 1986
 Rège, Philippe. Encyclopedia of French Film Directors, Volume 1''. Scarecrow Press, 2009.

External links

1927 births
2015 deaths
French stage actresses
French film actresses
French television actresses
Actresses from Paris